Deer Creek is a tributary of the Allegheny River located in both Allegheny and Butler counties in the U.S. state of Pennsylvania.

Course

Deer Creek joins the Allegheny River at the township of Harmar.

Tributaries
(Mouth at the Allegheny River)

Little Deer Creek 
Long Run 
Rawlins Run 
Blue Run 
Cunningham Run 
Cedar Run 
Dawson Run 
West Branch Deer Creek

See also

 Allegheny Islands State Park
 List of rivers of Pennsylvania
 List of tributaries of the Allegheny River

References

External links

U.S. Geological Survey: PA stream gaging stations

Rivers of Pennsylvania
Tributaries of the Allegheny River
Rivers of Allegheny County, Pennsylvania
Rivers of Butler County, Pennsylvania